The Inferior rectal nerves (inferior anal nerves, inferior hemorrhoidal nerve) usually branch from the pudendal nerve but occasionally arises directly from the sacral plexus; they cross the ischiorectal fossa along with the inferior rectal artery and veins, toward the anal canal and the lower end of the rectum, and is distributed to the Sphincter ani externus (external anal sphincter, EAS) and to the integument (skin) around the anus.

Branches of this nerve communicate with the perineal branch of the posterior femoral cutaneous and with the posterior scrotal nerves at the forepart of the perineum.

Supplies
Cutaneous innervation below the pectinate line and external anal sphincter.

See also
 Inferior rectal artery

Additional images

References

External links
 Details  at Oklahoma State
  - "The Female Perineum: Contents of the Pudendal Canal"
  - "Inferior view of female perineum, branches of the internal pudendal artery."
 
 
 

Nerves of the lower limb and lower torso